Sverre Andreas Jakobsson (born 8 February 1977) is an Icelandic-Norwegian handball manager and former player. With the Icelandic national handball team, he competed at two Olympics, winning the silver medal at the 2008 Olympics.

Playing career
Sverre started his career with KA at the age of 16 and helped the team win the Icelandic Cup in 1995 and the Icelandic championship in 1997. He won the national championship again in 2006 with Fram.

Coaching career
Sverre was hired as player-coach for Akureyri Handboltafélag in 2014.

In 2017, the club was relegated from the Úrvalsdeild. and shortly after, KA decided to break off from the cooperation and fielded their own team starting from 2017–2018. Þór continued to run its men's team under the Akureyri name and in 2018, the team finished first in 1. deild karla and was promoted back to the Úrvalsdeild along with KA, which finished second.

On 28 December 2018, Akureyri fired Sverre from his position as head coach.

In 2019, Sverre was hired as an assistant coach to KA. On 6 April 2019 he appeared in KA's last game of the season at the age of 42, stating that it was the final game of his playing career.

Titles, awards and achievements

Titles
Icelandic championship (2): 1998, 2006
Icelandic Cup (3): 1995, 1996, 2003
1. deild karla: 2018

Awards
Knight's Cross of the Order of the Falcon: 2008

References

External links
 Profile 

1977 births
Handball players at the 2008 Summer Olympics
Handball players at the 2012 Summer Olympics
Sverre Andreas Jakobsson
Knattspyrnufélag Akureyrar handball players
Sverre Andreas Jakobsson
Living people
Medalists at the 2008 Summer Olympics
Sverre Andreas Jakobsson
Olympic medalists in handball
Sverre Andreas Jakobsson
Recipients of the Order of the Falcon
Handball players from Oslo